The Royal Aircraft Factory F.E.10 (Farman Experimental No. 10) was an aircraft designed by John Kenworthy, Henry P. Folland, and Maj. Frank W. Goodden in June 1916. The design placed the pilot and a machine gun in front of the aircraft's propeller, which was in a nacelle braced between the undercarriage and the upper wing. It was to have been powered by a  Hispano-Suiza 8 engine, placed between the wings.

Specifications

References

F.E.10